Batik Solo Trans (abbreviated BST) is a bus rapid transit system serving the city of Surakarta, Central Java. Launched in 2010, it currently operates 12 corridors.

Summary
Batik Solo Trans was launched on 1 September 2010 by then-mayor of Surakarta Joko Widodo. The service, which initially had only a single corridor and 38 stations, was expanded with its second corridor in 2014 and a third in 2018.

In 2017, estimates place that 5,500-6,000 people used the first corridor daily, with another 3,500-4,000 in the second. The city's transportation board claimed that around 5,000 used the third corridor service daily. While it has some features of BRT systems, BST has low passenger throughput and lack a right of way in roads. 

There were 90 buses in service on 2021. The BST also uses local angkot to act as feeders to the service.

Bus Routes
Batik Solo Trans has 6 BRT routes, which are:
 Corridor 1: Adisumarmo Airport - Palur Bus Terminal (via Purwosari Train Station)
 Corridor 2: Kerten Sub Terminal - Palur Bus Terminal (via Balapan Train Station)
 Corridor 3: Tugu Cembengan - Kartasura Bus Terminal (via Klewer Market)
 Corridor 4: Palur Bus Terminal - Kartosuro Bus Terminal (via STP/ SOLO Tirtonadi Bus Terminal/ De Tjolomadu) 
 Corridor 5: Terminal Kartasura - Bekonang Sukoharjo (via South of SOLO Toll Gate) 
 Corridor 6: Terminal Tirtonadi - Solo Baru Sukoharjo (via The Park/Pandawa lima Pillar)

Feeder Routes
 Corridor 7: RSUD Ngipang (Regional Hospital) - Klewer Market
 Corridor 8: Tipes (Lotte Mart)- Jayawijaya Garden (Mojosongo)
 Corridor 9: Semanggi Sub Terminal - Mojosongo
 Corridor 10: Klewer Market - Palur Bus Terminal
 Corridor 11: Klewer Market - Solo Tirtonadi Bus Terminal
 Corridor 12: Klewer Market - Gentan Sukoharjo

References

Surakarta
Surakarta
2010 establishments in Indonesia